Stojanski Vrh is a village in the Municipality of Brežice, eastern Slovenia, close to the border with Croatia. The area is part of the traditional region of Lower Carniola. It is now included with the rest of the municipality in the Lower Sava Statistical Region.

References

External links
Stojanski Vrh on Geopedia

Populated places in the Municipality of Brežice